Epirus is a historical and geographical region of the southwestern Balkans, straddling modern Greece and Albania.

The name Epirus, from the Greek "Ήπειρος" meaning "continent" may also refer to:

Geographical 

 Epirus (region), one of the thirteen regions (administrative divisions) of Greece
 Northern Epirus, a term used to refer to those parts of the historical region which today are part of Albania

Historical
 Epirus (ancient state), a Greek state (330–167 BC)
 Epirus Vetus ("Old Epirus", 146 BC–395 AD), province of the Roman Empire
 Epirus Nova ("New Epirus"), a province of the Roman Empire
 Despotate of Epirus (1205–1479), one of the successor states of the Byzantine Empire
 Principality of Epirus, another name for the Ottoman pashalik of Yanina (1430–1868)
 Autonomous Republic of Northern Epirus, a short lived state (1914) proclaimed by the pro-Greek party in modern Southern Albania (Northern Epirus)

People 
 Epirus (mythology) from Greek mythology, daughter of Echion and Agave

See also
 Eprius, a genus of butterflies